The Greatest Hits of the Golden Groups: Bobby Vinton Sings the Goodies! is Bobby Vinton's fifth studio album, released in 1963. This album contains cover songs that were hits during the 1950s for the following artists: the Rays, the Penguins, the Platters, the Five Satins, Bobby Helms, Little Anthony and the Imperials, the Moonglows, Lee Andrews & the Hearts, the Heartbeats and Jesse Belvin. All of the tracks on this album were recorded in Nashville. "Over the Mountain (Across the Sea)" (previously a hit for the duo Johnnie & Joe) is the album's only single. All of the songs on this album were later include in the collection Bobby Vinton Sings the Golden Decade of Love.

On the back of the album cover, there is an error in the credits for who wrote the song "Goodnight My Love." The version of the song that is featured on this album was actually written by George Motola and John Marascalco but credits Mack Gordon and Harry Revel as songwriters. Gordon and Revel wrote a song with exactly the same title that was released in 1936.

Track listing

Album credits
Produced by Robert Morgan
Cover photo: Columbia Records Photo Studio - Henry Parker

Charts
Singles - Billboard (North America)

1963 albums
Bobby Vinton albums
Covers albums
Epic Records albums